2-Methylnaphthalene-1,4-diamine is a synthetic menadione analog with vitamin K activity.

2-Methylnaphthalene-1,4-diamine was first synthesized in 1925. In 1942 two different research groups noted the vitamin K activity of the compound. It forms a dihydrochloride salt (C11H14Cl2N2) with hydrochloric acid and one of the aforementioned research groups suggested the name vitamin K6 for the salt.

2-Methylnaphthalene-1,4-diamine and its dihydrochloride can be made from 2-methylnaphthalene or its close analogs. Dihydrochloride blackens without melting at about 300 °C.

4-Amino-3-methyl-1-naphthol or its dihydrochloride have not been used as commercial medicinal forms of vitamin K unlike phylloquinone and menadione for example.

Oral toxicity of dihydrochloride for rats is approximately the same as for 4-amino-2-methyl-1-naphthol hydrochloride.

References

Naphthylamines
Vitamin K
Substances discovered in the 1920s